Grini is a former metro station on the Røa Line of the Oslo Metro.

The station was located between Ekraveien and Eiksmarka, and was opened when the Røa Line was extended into Bærum on 22 December 1948. It was the first station on the Røa Line located in Bærum; the line would later be extended to Lijordet (1951) and Østerås (1972). Grini station was closed as a part of the Røa Line overhaul in 1995.

References

Oslo Metro stations in Bærum
Railway stations opened in 1948
Railway stations closed in 1995
Disused Oslo Metro stations
1948 establishments in Norway
1995 disestablishments in Norway